Theodore I Palaiologos or Palaeologus (Greek: Θεόδωρος Παλαιολόγος, full name: Theodoros Komnenos Doukas Angelos Palaiologos) ( – 24 April 1338) was Marquis of Montferrat from 1306 until his death.

Life
He was a son of Emperor Andronikos II Palaiologos and Irene of Montferrat. When his uncle John I died in 1305, the male line of the Aleramici Marquises of Montferrat became extinct. The March of Montferrat was passed to Irene's children. Patriarch Athanasius I of Constantinople blocked the candidacy of the elder son John, so Theodore went to Italy instead.

Theodore sailed to Genoa in 1306. In 1307 he married Argentina Spinola, daughter of Genoese magnate Opicino Spinola, Capitano del Popolo (co-ruler) of the Republic of Genoa. Spinola used his wealth to back Theodore's claim to Montferrat.

Theodore was opposed by Manfred IV of Saluzzo. Manfred was a cadet of the House of Savoy, and several Marquises of Montferrat had Savoyard wives. King Charles II of Naples also claimed parts of the March. He gradually overcame these foes and secured the whole March. In 1310 he received the imperial investiture from Emperor Henry VII.

Theodore died in Trino Vercellese in 1338. He was succeeded by his son John II Palaiologos.

Marriage and issue
Theodore and Argentina had:
John ΙΙ (1313–1372)
Yolande (1318–1342), who married Aimone, Count of Savoy

Writings
Theodore is known to have authored an original military manual, titled Les Enseignemens ou Ordenances pour un Siegneur qui a Guerres et Grans Gouvernemens a Faire, often referred to as Les enseignements. Originally composed in Greek in 1326-1327 while Theodore was in Constantinople, it exists now only in the medieval French translation of Jean de Vignay. The work is one of the most interesting medieval military manuals in that it is not dependent on Vegetius' De Re Militari or any other known classical text. It thus serves as an example of the military thinking of the late Byzantine and Medieval worlds.

Ancestors

External links

The French translation of Les enseignements
Les enseignements de Théodore Paléologue,  Christine Knowles (ed.)

References

Sources

|-

1290 births
1338 deaths
Marquesses of Montferrat
Palaiologos dynasty
14th-century Byzantine people
14th-century Italian nobility
Medieval Greek military writers
14th-century Byzantine writers
Sons of Byzantine emperors
People from Trino